The Harrington Block is a historic commercial and retail building at 376–390 Moody Street in Waltham, Massachusetts.  The three story brick building was built 1884-85 by Charles Harrington, a local real estate speculator who was also employed by the Boston Manufacturing Company.  It is one of the city's few Queen Anne commercial building, and is the oldest commercial building on Moody Street to escape major alteration.  The ground floor originally housed retail establishments (as it does now), while the upper floors were residential.

The building was listed on the National Register of Historic Places in 1989.

See also
National Register of Historic Places listings in Waltham, Massachusetts

References

Commercial blocks on the National Register of Historic Places in Massachusetts
Queen Anne architecture in Massachusetts
Buildings and structures in Waltham, Massachusetts
National Register of Historic Places in Waltham, Massachusetts